The University of Calgary Solar Car Team is a multi-disciplinary student-run solar car racing  team at the University of Calgary, based in Calgary, Alberta, Canada. It was established to design and build a solar car to compete internationally in the American Solar Challenge (ASC) (previously named the North American Solar Challenge) and the World Solar Challenge (WSC). The team is primarily composed of undergraduate students studying Engineering, Business, Science, Arts and Kinesiology. The mission of the University of Calgary Solar Car Team is to educate the community about sustainable energy and to serve as an interdisciplinary project through which students and faculty from various departments can collaborate in supporting sustainable energy.

History 
The University of Calgary Solar Car Team was established by the University in the fall of 2004 in response to the North American Solar Challenge 2005 whose finish line was in Calgary, Alberta. The team's first vehicle was completed in 9 months and managed to place 13th despite their limited experience.

Soleon

Miracle workers
The team performed a "miracle" by managing to establish a strong student base with which to construct the car, procure significant sponsorship and successfully build a highly successful vehicle with limited experience all in approximately 9 months. Established teams have two years to refine existing designs between races.

The X1 (prototype) 
In preparation for its first rayce, the University of Calgary Solar Team constructed and tested a prototype of their designs before building the final car. The X1 was a mock-up of and predecessor to Soleon. The X1 was used for driver training and allowed the team to test various design decisions to help ensure a successful final product. The X1 was constructed from a steel chassis with a fibreglass shell which was coated with gelcoat which made the vehicle approximately twice the final weight of its sister car.

First race results 
In its first year of existence, the University of Calgary Solar Team successfully competed in the NASC and the WSC. In the 2005 NASC, Soleon, their first generation rayce car placed 13th out of 17 cars that made it to the finish line.  In the 2005 WSC Soleon placed 10th overall (out of 18) and first in its class.  After hearing about this success, Seymour Schulich was inspired to donate $25 million (another $25 million was matched by the Alberta government) to the University of Calgary Engineering department, which was renamed the Schulich School of Engineering.

Schulich I

2007 WSC race 
Since the success of Soleon in the 2005 races, the team had to redesign for the new regulations for WSC, and prepare for the harder competition it faced from changing class to the higher, more competitive Challenge class. This class included higher efficiency solar cells, upright seating, and teams that had been  for the last 20 years. After shipping their new car to Australia, and testing it before scrutineering, the car had a rear tire blow out on the race track in Darwin, and resulted in the car spinning around having the tail section impacting into the guard rail and ripped from the car. The team then had to rebuild and redesign the tail section in one night before racing. Despite the higher competition and race track crash, the team managed to be the first (of six) Canadian teams to cross the timing finish line, finish 8th (out of 19) in the Challenge class, and 15th (out of 37) overall.

2008 NASC race 
Schulich I was improved after WSC 2007 for racing in the 2008 North American Solar Challenge. The rayce from Dallas, Texas to Calgary lasted ten days, with the University of Calgary Solar Team placing 6th (out of 15).

Schulich Axiom

2010 ASC 
The University of Calgary Solar Car Team's 3rd generation car, Schulich Axiom, was first raced in the 2010 ASC. The race spanned 1770 km from Tulsa, Oklahoma to Chicago, Illinois. The team finished in 6th place (of 18 teams) and received both the Sportsmanship and Mechanical Engineering awards for the race. With regulation changes for the 2011 WSC, the team re-engineered the design of Schulich Axiom and completely rebuilt the solar car. Some of the changes made include switching to silicon solar cells and reducing the weight of the car.

2011 WSC 
The 2011 WSC took place on October 16–23, 2011 and was a road endurance race from Darwin, Northern Territory to Adelaide, South Australia, a total of over 3000km. The University of Calgary Solar Team entered the Schulich Axiom and placed

Schulich Delta

Design and Construction: Focused on Practicality 
Schulich Delta, the team's fourth generation vehicle, was designed over the course of eight months, and construction took another three months. Delta was a radical departure for the team, featuring two doors, cup holders, four wheels, a passenger seat and cargo space for the very first time. It was also Canada's first cruiser class car.

2013 WSC 
The team entered the Schulich Delta to compete in the Cruiser class in the 2013 World Solar Challenge that took place on October 6–13, 2013. The team placed 8th in the Cruiser Class.

2015 FSGP 
After some improvements to Delta's design, the team competed in the Formula Sun Grand Prix 2015 held at the Circuit of the Americas in Austin, Texas where it was the first cruiser-class vehicle to ever compete at the event. The event took place on Sunday, July 26 until Friday, July 31, 2016. The team completed 84 laps, placing 9th overall. Its fastest lap was 5:33.886.

Schulich Elysia

Design and Construction 
The University of Calgary's sixth generation vehicle looked to make significant improvements of their cruiser class vehicle while keeping practicality their main focus. The team started the design phase in 2016 and crafted a catamaran inspired frame to help increase aerodynamics and reduce weight. Furthermore, the team implemented NACA ducts and fans to greatly improve on battery cooling performance. Another main focus was on the "every-day" user by implementing a touch-screen centre console info-tainment system, cupholders, back up cameras as well as speakers. The team also implemented a sophisticated charging system that includes the electric vehicle standard SAE-J1772 connector which allows the car to do level 1 or 2 type charging from the wall.

2019 FSGP 
After a 3-year build cycle, the University of Calgary Solar Car team raced the Schulich Elysia at the Formula Sun Grand Prix 2019 held at the Circuit of the Americas in Austin, Texas. This was the first year that the competition had a separate MOV (Multi-Occupancy Vehicle) category and the team finished first place in this class and fourth place overall out of 17 teams, completing 122 laps. Their fastest lap was 5:05.971.

Awards 
At the FSGP 2019, the team was given four additional awards at the award ceremony: The Mechanical Design award, the MOV Charging System Award, Aesthetics Award and the Corner 8 Award.

Achievements

Cars

X1 (prototype)
Maximum Achieved Speed: ~70 km/h
Solar Array Type: none (stickers merely for show)
Chassis: Steel Space frame
Shell Composition: Fibreglass & Gelcoat
Commissioned: May 2005
Decommissioned: June 2006
Current Uses: X1 has been decommissioned. The chassis is all that remains. It is suspended against a wall in the University of Calgary Solar Team's workshop.

Soleon
Maximum Achieved Speed: 140 km/h
Solar Array Type: Silicon
Chassis: Aluminum Space frame
Shell Composition: Carbon Fiber & Kevlar
Weight: ~500 lbs 
Commissioned: June 2005
Decommissioned: July 2007
Current Uses: In the fall of 2008 Soleon was donated to the Calgary Telus World of Science and was on display for 2 years.  Soleon is now retired and looking for a nice warm garage to rest.

Schulich I
Maximum Achieved Speed: 105 km/h
Solar Array Type: Gallium arsenide (GaAs) Triple-junction 
Chassis: Steel Space frame
Shell Composition: Carbon Fiber & Kevlar
Weight: ~520 lbs 
Commissioned: September 2007
Decommissioned: May 2011
Current Uses: Participated in the 2007 Panasonic World Solar Challenge and the 2008 North American Solar Challenge. Since Axiom is now being used for driver training, mechanical testing and PR events, Schulich I has been retired.

Schulich Axiom (2010)
Maximum Achieved Speed: 130 km/h
Solar Array Type: Gallium arsenide (GaAs) Triple-junction 
Chassis: Carbon Fiber & Kevlar
Shell Composition: Carbon Fiber & Kevlar
Weight: ~600 lbs 
Commissioned: October 2009
Current Uses: Placed 6th overall in the 2010 North American Solar Challenge. Schulich Axiom (2010) is now predominantly being used as a display vehicle.

Schulich Axiom (2011)
Maximum Achieved Speed: 110 km/h
Solar Array Type: Silicon Monocrystalline (Si) UC Solar Embedded 
Chassis: Carbon Fiber 
Shell Composition: Carbon Fiber 
Weight: ~390 lbs 
Commissioned: May 2011 
Current Uses: Planning on racing in the 2011 World Solar Challenge. All improvements have since been completed to Schulich Axiom. "It is evident from the previous race that weight is no minor detail. We have taken Axiom on its diet and the result is stunning. Axiom has dropped from around 600 lbs. without driver and ballast to 390 lbs. A loss of 210 lbs!" -Mico Madamesila

References 

 https://www.ucalgary.ca/news/utoday/november23-09/solarcar
 CTV.ca

External links

 Official Team Website
 WSC Website
 NASC Website
[1] http://americansolarchallenge.org/the-competition/2019-formula-sun-grand-prix/

University of Calgary
Solar car racing
Photovoltaics